PC PowerPlay (PCPP) is Australia's only dedicated PC games magazine. PC PowerPlay focuses on news and reviews for upcoming and newly released games on the Microsoft Windows platform. The magazine also reviews computer hardware for use on gaming computers. The magazine is published by Future Australia.

In 2018, Future, owner and publisher of PC Gamer, purchased PC PowerPlay and related computing titles from nextmedia, incorporating PC PowerPlay articles into the online versions of PC Gamer.

While no physical media is included now, for most of the life of the magazine it included either a CD or DVD, that would be filled with game demos, freeware games, anime shows, film/anime/game teaser trailers, game patches, game mods, game maps, PC utilities and computer wallpapers.

Main sections 
The main sections included in each month's magazine include letters to the editor, previews & reviews, feature articles & artwork, pictures of computers owned by readers, flashbacks to old games, lists of PC builds to help people purchase new products and advertising. There are also various opinion and comedic sections such as "Dr. Claw" and "Yellow Boots".

Scoring system 
Each review of a game or product is given a score out of ten. PC PowerPlay has given 10/10 scores to a number of games including:

A 10/10 game is connoted not as a perfect game but as a "masterpiece with flaws", and replaced the previous score out of 100. The reasoning for the switch was "What is the difference between a game which gets 95% and a game that gets 96%?"

Under the previous percentage system, only Wolfenstein 3D ever received 100%. That 100% was converted to 10/10 when printed in review score summaries in later issues, while the next closest score ever given, 98%, was given to:
 Deus Ex
 Falcon 4.0
 Half-Life
 System Shock 2
 Total Annihilation
 Unreal

Website & forum 
In addition to the magazine itself there were several websites that are closely linked with it. The official PC PowerPlay website was launched in 2001, but was taken offline following the collapse of the online division of publishing company Next Media, then lay dormant until July 2006.

While it had a typical frontpage with online articles most of the traffic went to the PC PowerPlay forums. The forum database had been preserved across a number of technology migrations. It first began on a ColdFusion powered site in 2001, then moved to phpBB and was converted to vBulletin in 2007. It was one of the largest Australian specific online forums while it existed. The forums provided discussion of gaming and computer related software and technology. There were also "off-topic" sections dedicated to general discussion and banter, serious discussions regarding Australian national, regional and international issues and a section for discussions of TV shows, films and music. This design also allows the organisation of multiplayer games amongst the PCPP readers and other forum members. The general discussion section of the PCPP Forum is titled "Rhubarb", because of editor Anthony Fordham's love of the old British joke of having extras in movie crowd scenes say "rhubarbrhubarbrhubarb" to simulate incidental conversation.

A website re-launch occurred on 22 April 2009, consisting of a customised Joomla install and layout, and an intention to regularly updated blogs, news articles and major features, although it quickly fell back into the same problems with contributors not updating the news sections, leaving the forum to continue as the only regularly updated section.

On Wednesday, 12 March 2010, the PCPP website and forum software was replaced with a CMS provided by CyberGamer. This software also powers the cybergamer.com.au website. PCPP is now listed as a "Media Partner" of CyberGamer whilst CyberGamer now receives advertising space within PCPP and PCPP's sister magazine, Hyper. A press release was issued on 18 March, detailing the arrangement between both parties. As part of this online merger, PCPP's established community were incorporated within the CyberGamer Network. The CyberGamer Network acts as a single-sign on service for all CyberGamer-powered sites. Hyper Magazine was due to migrate their web presence to a CyberGamer network powered system on 8 April 2010.

The transition to the CyberGamer forums was considered by the community to have been handled badly and on 12 August 2010, PC PowerPlays then-editor, Anthony Fordham, announced that the PCPP Forums would revert to the old vBulletin software, stating that the PC PowerPlay community were not happy with the current CyberGamer software. Discussions were made regarding a potential merger with the Hyper game forum that was centred around console gaming, but no concrete plans ever came about.

The forum was eventually closed in December 2017 as costs to run the server and the dwindling userbase made it uneconomical to continue. The frontpage was redirected to a PC Gamer website for the magazines writers to update, but ceased updating articles in 2018.

CD-ROM version, DVD-ROM version and disc-less version 
The magazine launched in 1996 with a 640 Megabyte CD-ROM cover disc, which was upgraded to a double CD-ROM set in January 2000 issue. The DVD-ROM edition joined the line-up in April 2002 issue alongside the CD-ROM version for three years, the CD-ROM version finally ceased production in 2005.

The August 1998 cover disc of PC PowerPlay was infected with the Malburg virus, causing the magazine to apologise in the following issue and give away antivirus software from Kaspersky Lab. Malburg was also spread by a PC Gamer cover disc and WarGames: Defcon 1 in the same year, which CNN Money stated caused the malware to become a "widespread threat".

From April to December 2002 the DVD-ROM edition of PC PowerPlay also contained one episode of an Anime show that was licensed and distributed in Australia by Madman Entertainment such as Boogiepop Phantom, Love Hina, Mobile Suit Gundam Wing, and Sorcerous Stabber Orphen.

The November 2005 edition included the first discless magazine at a little over half the price of the DVD-ROM version. While sales were not spectacular, dropping the CD-ROM did slow the rate of decline of the non-DVD-ROM version of the magazine. This saw subscriptions being offered for the disc-less version at half the sale price.

The Bunker was a section of the DVD-ROM originally compiled each month by "ROM", a respected member of the PCPP online community. However, following his retirement from the position (announced in issue #143), The Bunker undertook a drastic transformation and became the PCPP Community Bunker. Readers and members of the online community produced and were actively encouraged to submit to the section.

The Bunker was replaced in 2009 with a streamlined Applications and Utilities section.

Competition 
Australian publishing company Derwent Howard launched a competitor called PC Games Addict in 2002, using some Australian content filled out by licensed content from PC Gamer in the UK and PC Format. The magazine ceased publication in 2005, leaving PC PowerPlay with no direct competition in the Australian market for PC games magazines. There was indirect competition from technology enthusiast magazines such as Atomic and FamilyPC Australia. There were also imported magazines from the UK and US such as PC Gamer and PC Zone but their circulations were minimal in comparison to the local products. An Australian version of PC Gamer launched shortly after PC PowerPlay but was shut down in 1999 following a dispute between the publisher and printer

See also 
Hyper

References

External links 

Archive of PC PowerPlay magazines at the Internet Archive

Computer magazines published in Australia
Video game magazines published in Australia
Monthly magazines published in Australia
Magazines established in 1996
1996 establishments in Australia
Magazines published in Sydney
Bi-monthly magazines published in Australia